James Redford may refer to:
 James Redford (politician)
 James Redford (filmmaker)